Xenorhinotherium is an extinct genus of macraucheniine macraucheniids, closely related to Macrauchenia of Patagonia. The type species is X. bahiense.

Taxonomy 
Some authors consider the genus Xenorhinotherium a synonym of Macrauchenia, while all others consider it a distinct genus. The name Xenorhinotherium means "Strange-Nosed Beast" and bahiense refers to the Brazilian state of Bahia, where the first fossils were found.

Xenorhinotherium was a rather derived representative of the Macraucheniidae, a group of litopterns with camel-like appearances. Probably derived from lower Miocene forms such as Cramauchenia and Theosodon, this animal probably closely related to the large macraucheniids of the Pliocene and Pleistocene, such as Macrauchenia and Windhausenia.

Below is a phylogenetic tree of the Macraucheniidae, based on the work of McGrath et al. 2018, showing the position of Xenorhinotherium.

Characteristics 

In life, X. bahiense would have vaguely resembled a tall, humpless camel with three toes on each foot and either a saiga-like proboscis or a moose-like nose. Pictographs from the Serranía de La Lindosa rock formation of Guaviare, Colombia, show what might possibly be Xenorhinotherium with three toes and a trunk, though the claims are highly controversial, and it is uncertain whether they even date to the last Ice Age.

Distribution 
Fossils of Xenorhinotherium, dating from the Late Pleistocene to the Early Holocene, have been found in the states of Bahia, the Jandaíra Formation of Rio Grande do Norte, and Minas Gerais in modern Brazil, and also in Venezuela, in the localities of Muaco, Taima-Taima and Cuenca del Lago.

Though not known from other countries, computer modelling suggests that the habitat in the western Andean slopes of Colombia, Ecuador, and Peru would have been suitable for this animal, particularly in areas that have not been extensively excavated yet.

References

Bibliography

Further reading

Macraucheniids
Pleistocene first appearances
Holocene extinctions
Pleistocene mammals of South America
Ensenadan
Lujanian
Pleistocene Brazil
Holocene Brazil
Fossils of Brazil
Pleistocene Venezuela
Fossils of Venezuela
Fossil taxa described in 1988
Prehistoric placental genera